The Nurseries and Child-Minders Regulation Act 1948 was an Act of the Parliament of the United Kingdom. It formally recognised the existence of childminding, and introduced provisions for the registration of child-minders and the inspection of premises. This legislation laid down, for the first time, minimum standards required for people caring for the children of other people in their own homes for "reward".

Notes

United Kingdom Acts of Parliament 1948